Netherton is the name of several places:

England
Netherton, Farway, a manor house in Devon
Netherton, Hampshire
Netherton, Merseyside
Netherton, Northumberland
Netherton, Oxfordshire
Netherton, Peterborough, Cambridgeshire
Netherton, Teignbridge, a location in Devon
Netherton, West Midlands
Netherton Tunnel Branch Canal
West Yorkshire
Netherton, Kirklees 
Netherton, Wakefield
Netherton, Worcestershire

Scotland
Netherton, Glasgow
Netherton, North Lanarkshire
Netherton, Stirling

New Zealand
Netherton, New Zealand, a locality in Waikato Region

See also
Nethertown, Cumbria